Channi Taja Rehan (Urdu,), is a village in Sargodha, Punjab, Pakistan. It has been home to the Rehan clan of Punjab which in Mughal times ruled over the area from Chiniot to Kalowal with Kalowal being its local capital.

References

List of cities near the village 
Kalowal
Sargodha 
Rabwah

External links
 Gazetteer of the Shahpur District.

Villages in Sargodha District